Xoşçobanlı may refer to:
 Xoşçobanlı, Imishli, Azerbaijan
 Xoşçobanlı, Masally, Azerbaijan

See also
 Khoshchobanly (disambiguation)